Khirdarar (also Romanized as Khīrdarār; also known as Dowrāhī-ye Bāzvand) is a village in Bazvand Rural District, Central District, Rumeshkhan County, Lorestan Province, Iran.  It lies north-east of the village of Bazvandi. At the 2006 census, its population was 1,483, in 306 families.

References 

Populated places in Rumeshkhan County